Dynamic electrophoretic mobility is a parameter that determines intensity of electroacoustic phenomena, such as Colloid Vibration Current and Electric Sonic Amplitude in colloids. It is similar to electrophoretic mobility, but at high frequency, on a scale of megahertz. Usual electrophoretic mobility is the low frequency limit of the dynamic electrophoretic mobility.

Colloidal chemistry
Condensed matter physics
Soft matter